Yasuo Kuwahara (Kuwahara Yasuo)  (December 12, 1946 in Kobe, Japan – December 6, 2003) was a Japanese mandolin player and composer for mandolin orchestra. He was chairman of various musical institutions and organizations, including the Nara National Women's College, the Kuwahara Mandolin Institute and the Japan Association of Music Exchange.  In addition, he taught composition and artistic mandolin.

After completing his studies with Professor Kinuko Hiruma, he became well known in Japan for his musical solo performances on the mandolin and outstanding technique. He made his European debut at a Zupfmusikfestival in Mannheim in 1982, and as a result, the European plucked-stringed orchestra circles became aware of him. After his performance in 1983 in Providence, USA, Yasuo Kuwahara was also known in North America. After that he won increasing worldwide recognition and fame for his playing and compositions, performing in his native Japan, as well as Italy, France, Germany, Switzerland, Sweden, Denmark, Spain, Austria, Belgium, Australia, Russia and the United States of America. His compositions include works for the mandolin orchestra, as well as chamber ensembles and soloists.

Major works

Orchestral
Angels Move "籟動", Mandolin Concerto

Mandolin orchestra
Dance of Fire Festival
Beyond the Rainbow
Song of the Japanese Autumn
Novemberfest
Railroad song
Steamy Steaming
Outward of Forest
Pear-shaped Dance
Within the Fence

Mandolin solo
Moon and Mountain Witch
Jongara
Winter Light
Impromptu
Perpetual Motion
Silent Door
Improvised Poem

Compositions
Yasuo Kuwahara's expressive compositions tell stories in musical fashion. The Song of Japanese Autumn describes the "struggle of peasants" in the early fall against the time when the autumn gales fall with heavy showers, and the stillness afterward when the weather calms down again at the end of the piece — all told musically with "accented rhythm", "agitated melody", tremolo and peaceful cadenza.

Characteristic of Kuwahara's pieces are long traditional (for Japanese compositions) expressive tremolo passages, but he also weaved modern playing techniques into his compositions. This was taken to the extreme in his orchestral work Novemberfest, in which he integrated seven different mandolin-voice percussive effects. Instead of the mandolin's normal plucking-of-strings with a pick, or using tremolo, sound is made with fingers, knuckles or the plectrum knocked on different parts of the instrument. Yasuo Kuwahara was also known to use stylistic elements of contemporary music in his compositions, such as Minimal music.

Recordings of his compositions
 Clicking Ecstasy by Mülheimer Zupforchester, Detlef Tewes conducting, 1998:
 Track 7, The Song of the Japanese Autumn: I. Andante 
 Track 8, The Song of the Japanese Autumn: II. Allegro non troppo
 Track 9, The Song of the Japanese Autumn: III. Meno mosso 
 Track 10, The Song of the Japanese Autumn: IV. Allegro non troppo 
 Track 11, The Song of the Japanese Autumn: V. Andante

References

See also
 List of mandolinists (sorted)
 List of Japanese composers

1946 births
2003 deaths
20th-century classical composers
20th-century Japanese composers
20th-century Japanese male musicians
21st-century classical composers
21st-century Japanese composers
21st-century Japanese male musicians
Japanese classical composers
Japanese classical mandolinists
Japanese male classical composers
Musicians from Kobe